Ella's Americana Folk Art Cafe is a restaurant and bar in the Seminole Heights section of Tampa, Florida. Ernie Locke and Melissa Deming opened it in 2009. It is decorated with artwork from regional artists, hosts live music on the weekends, and serves Soul Food on Sundays. It is also known for its chocolate bacon bars. It is part of a group of notable restaurants in Seminole Heights that includes The Refinery (twice nominated for a James Beard Award) and the Independent (restaurant). It is located at 5119 North Nebraska Avenue.

References

Restaurants in Tampa, Florida
2009 establishments in Florida
Restaurants established in 2009
Drinking establishments in Florida